655 Briseïs is a minor planet orbiting the Sun.

References

External links 
 
 

000655
Discoveries by Joel Hastings Metcalf
Named minor planets
000655
19071104